William Menzies Newbigging (27 December 1874 – 16 October 1954) was a Scottish professional footballer who played for Tottenham Hotspur, Motherwell, Folkestone, Fulham and Queens Park Rangers.

Career
Newbigging started his career with local club Lanark County before joining Tottenham Hotspur for the 1896–97 season when the club turned professional. His debut occurred on 5 September 1896 against Sheppey United in the Southern League Division One. He left after one season with Spurs and went on to play for Motherwell (no appearances in major competitions recorded), Folkestone, Fulham, Queens Park Rangers and then back to his hometown club. His younger brothers Sandy and Harry were also footballers.

Career statistics

Notes

References

1874 births
1954 deaths
Scottish footballers
Association football forwards
Tottenham Hotspur F.C. players
Motherwell F.C. players
Folkestone F.C. players
Fulham F.C. players
Queens Park Rangers F.C. players
Southern Football League players
Footballers from South Lanarkshire
Sportspeople from Larkhall